Luca Vanni was the defending champion but chose not to defend his title.

Uladzimir Ignatik won the title after defeating Christopher Heyman 6–7(3–7), 6–4, 7–6(7–3) in the final.

Seeds

Draw

Finals

Top half

Bottom half

References
Main Draw
Qualifying Draw

Internazionali di Tennis Castel del Monte - Singles
2017 Singles